Zombiepox (also ZOMBIEPOX) is a cooperative board game in which players fight the spread of zombies that threaten to take over the town. It was developed by Tiltfactor Laboratory, a game research center located at Dartmouth College, New Hampshire, focusing on games and play that investigate and explain ideas.

History of the game 

Zombiepox is an evolution of Pox: Save the People, which was developed by Tiltfactor in coordination with the Mascoma Valley Health Initiative to stop the spread of misinformation concerning the effects of vaccination.
Zombiepox is also designed to be educational and initial research showed that people's sentiments on vaccinations became more positive when faced with the fictitious disease in the game. Playing the game also appears to improve people's systems thinking abilities.

Gameplay 

Designed as a board game for one to four players, the game centers on a town that has been infected with a disease called zombiepox. The objective is to stop the spread and help humans escape by vaccinating them. Players win the game if the disease can no longer spread and lose if too many people become full-blown zombies.

Awards and recognition 

The game won a Major Fun Award for Cooperation Thinking in 2012. It was also selected for display at IndieCade's 2012 Indie Game Showcase.

References

External links 
 Tiltfactor Laboratory website.
 Dartmouth Now article about Tiltfactor's Professor Mary Flanagan

Board games introduced in 2012
Educational board games
American board games